Lansing School is a historic school building located at Lansing, Ashe County, North Carolina.  It was built in 1937-1938 by the Works Progress Administration, and is a two-story, 19 bay wide, building constructed of random coursed native granite blocks.  The building features modest Colonial Revival style details. The building has a standing seam metal hipped roof with small gabled attic dormers.  Also on the property is a two-story, four-bay, brick building built in 1952-53 to serve as high school classrooms.

In 2020, the Lansing School was purchased by Lost Province Center for Cultural Arts (LPCCA), a nonprofit organization whose mission is "to bridge the urban-rural divide, revitalize our community and promote the cultural arts and skills of the Southern Appalachian region." LPCCA will focus on preserving and teaching three aspects of Southern Appalachian culture: arts and crafts, culinary arts, and music. The organization plans to restore the historic property to provide a spacious venue for classes, special events, sustainable multi‐use housing, a signature farm-to‐table restaurant and a showcase gallery, along with boutique apartments that can be rented by students, teachers, and tourists alike.

It was listed on the National Register of Historic Places in 2009.

References

Works Progress Administration in North Carolina
School buildings on the National Register of Historic Places in North Carolina
School buildings completed in 1938
Schools in Ashe County, North Carolina
National Register of Historic Places in Ashe County, North Carolina